Clivillés is a Spanish surname. Notable people with the surname include:

Robert Clivillés (born 1964), American artist and record producer
Angel Clivillés, American singer

See also
Clivillés + Cole, American pop group

Spanish-language surnames